Daniel Mekbib (born 4 July 1992 in Bruntál) is a Czech professional squash player. As of February 2018, he was ranked number 117 in the world. He is in the Czech Republic men's national squash team.

Mekbib's father is Ethiopian.

References

1992 births
Living people
Czech male squash players
People from Bruntál
Czech people of Ethiopian descent
Competitors at the 2017 World Games
Sportspeople from the Moravian-Silesian Region